Lisa Eder (born 12 August 2001) is an Austrian ski jumper.

Career
On August 9, 2015, she started in the Alpencup for the first time. When she jumped the small Vogtlandschanzen in Klingenthal, she took 18th place. She celebrated her first victory in the Alpencup on August 11, 2016, on the Pöhlbachschanze in Pöhla. On August 18, 2017, she was allowed to start in the Continental Cup for the first time and finished 15th on the Fichtelbergschanzen in Oberwiesenthal. At the Continental Cup on the Tveitanbakken in Notodden on December 15, 2017, she narrowly missed her first podium finish in fourth place.

For the World Cup on the Miyanomori Ski Jump Stadium in Sapporo and on the Zaō Hill in Zaō, she was nominated for the first time for World Cup jumping. While she still failed to qualify in Sapporo, she finished 36th in Zaō on January 19, 2018, missing her first World Cup points. On January 20, 2018, she took sixth place in the team competition together with Chiara Hölzl, Claudia Purker and Jacqueline Seifriedsberger. She also took part in the Junior World Championships in Kandersteg. In the individual from the Lötschberg Hill she took 24th place and seventh place together with Marita Kramer, Sophie Mair and Claudia Purker. On March 24, 2018, she achieved her best World Cup result to date with eleventh place on the Audi Arena Oberstdorf in Oberstdorf.

At the 2019 Junior Championships in Lahti, Finland, she won the bronze medal with the Austrian junior team, which also included Marita Kramer, Lisa Hirner and Claudia Purker, while finishing fourth in the mixed team and tenth in the singles. On February 9, 2019, together with her teammates Jacqueline Seifriedsberger, Chiara Hölzl and Eva Pinkelnig, she reached the podium of a World Cup competition for the first time in the team competition on the Logarska dolina in Ljubno, Slovenia. On February 8 and 9, 2020, she finished eighth and seventh in Hinzenbach, her first two places in the top ten in an individual World Cup.

At the Olympic Winter Games in Beijing, she took fifth place with the Austrian mixed team. In the individual competition, she was eighth.

She is a member of SK Saalfelden-Salzburg.

Results

World Cup

Standings

Grand Prix

Standings

References

External links

2001 births
Living people
Austrian female ski jumpers
Olympic ski jumpers of Austria
Ski jumpers at the 2022 Winter Olympics
21st-century Austrian women